Cettiidae is a newly validated family of small insectivorous songbirds ("warblers"), formerly placed in the Old World warbler "wastebin" assemblage. It contains the typical bush warblers (Cettia) and their relatives.  As a common name, cettiid warblers is usually used.

Some taxonomic authorities include this entire family, along with the related genera Erythrocercus and Scotocerca, in an enlarged family Scotocercidae.

Its members occur mainly in Asia, ranging into Oceania and Europe. The pseudo-tailorbirds, tesias and stubtails, as well as Tickellia and Abroscopus warblers, are mostly found in the forests of south and southeastern Asia, with one species of stubtail reaching as far north as Japan and Siberia. Only one species, Neumann's warbler (Hemitesia neumanni), occurs in Africa. The range of the genus Cettia extends west to Western Europe, while that of Horornis extends well into the Pacific, as far as Fiji and Palau. Most of the species in the family are sedentary, but the Asian stubtail is wholly migratory and the Japanese bush warbler and Cetti's warbler are partly migratory over much of their range. A few species, such as the pale-footed bush warbler, are altitudinal migrants.

The species are small, stubby birds. Most have moderately long to long tails, while the stubtails and tesias have tiny tails that do not even emerge past their tail coverts. The group is typically clad in dull plumage, often with a line above the eye, but some are more colorful. Altogether the Cettiidae are a quite variable group containing many aberrant birds that hitherto had been uncomfortably placed with a wide range of unrelated families. The Locustellidae, which contain birds which appear very similar to many cettiids, are far more uniform by contrast.

Most live in scrubland and frequently hunt food by clambering through thick tangled growth.

Taxonomy
The family Cettiidae was introduced by Per Alström and coworkers in 2006.

The following cladogram showing the family relationships is based on a study by Carl Oliveros and coworkers published in 2019.  The number of species is taken from the bird list maintained by Frank Gill, Pamela Rasmussen and David Donsker on behalf of the International Ornithological Committee (IOC).

The phylogenetic relationships between the eight genera were determined in a 2011 study by Per Alström and coworkers.

The family contains 31 species in eight genera.

References

Sources 

 del Hoyo, Josep; Elliott, Andrew & Sargatal, Jordi (eds.) (2006): Handbook of Birds of the World (Volume 11: Old World Flycatchers to Old World Warblers). Lynx Edicions, Barcelona. 
 Sefc, K.M.; Payne, R.B. & Sorenson, M.D. (2003): Phylogenetic relationships of African sunbird-like warblers: Moho Hypergerus atriceps, Green Hylia Hylia prasina and Tit-hylia Pholidornis rushiae. Ostrich 74(1-2): 8-17. PDF fulltext

 
Bird families
Taxa named by Per Alström
Taxa named by Per G.P. Ericson
Taxa named by Per Sundberg (ornithologist)
Taxa named by Urban Olsson